The 1936 United States presidential election in Michigan took place on November 3, 1936, as part of the 1936 United States presidential election. Voters chose 19 representatives, or electors, to the Electoral College, who voted for president and vice president.

Michigan was won by Democratic incumbents president Franklin D. Roosevelt and vice president John Nance Garner, defeating Republican candidate Alf Landon and his running mate Frank Knox by 317,061 votes, or a margin of 17.57%.

Results

Results by county

See also
 United States presidential elections in Michigan

References

Michigan
1936
1936 Michigan elections